MCV may refer to:

Business
 Manufacturing Commercial Vehicles, an Egyptian commercial vehicle manufacturer owned by Daimler AG
 MCV Broadband, former name of Docomo Pacific, a telecommunications company in Guam
 MCV Bus and Coach, a bus body builder, based in Ely, Cambridgeshire, England
 Midland Cogeneration Venture, a natural gas fired electrical and steam co-generation plant in Midland, Michigan
 McV is a former identity of McVitie's biscuits
 Mobile Content Venture, a joint venture of United States broadcast groups dedicated to improving mobile DTV content

Medicine
 Mutated citrullinated vimentin, anti-MCV is a biomarker for diagnosing rheumatoid arthritis
 Mean corpuscular volume, a measure of red blood cell volume
 Merkel cell polyomavirus, a DNA virus of the polyomavirus group
 Molluscum contagiosum virus, a DNA poxvirus
 Meningococcal conjugate vaccine, a conjugated vaccine

Science and technology
 Mesoscale convective vortex, in meteorology
 Model–view–controller architecture, in software engineering
 Mobile Communication services on board Vessels (MCV services), for the use of mobile phones on ships in the European Union

Transportation
 Manchester Victoria station, its National Rail station code
 Mega City Vehicle, the former name of the BMW i3, an urban electric car
 Morris Cowley Van, a car-based light van based on the Morris Oxford (1950–1956)
 McArthur River Mine Airport, IATA airport code for McArthur River Mine Airport, Northern Territory Australia

Video gaming
 MCV, a UK based trade magazine focused on the video game industry
 Mobile Construction Vehicle, in the Command & Conquer game series

Military
 , a mine clearance vehicle of the Japan Ground Self-Defense Force
 Maneuver Combat Vehicle, a wheeled tank destroyer of the Japan Ground Self-Defense Force

Other uses
 Medical College of Virginia, the medical campus of Virginia Commonwealth University, Richmond, Virginia
 Middlesex County Volunteers, an 18th-century colonial fife & drum corps in the Greater Boston area, Massachusetts, USA
 Modular Capture Vessel, ships specialized on capturing unwanted liquids on the sea - f.i. leaked oil
 MCV, the year 1105 in Roman numerals
 Living Colombia Movement (Movimiento Colombia Viva), a Colombian political party
 Miss Chinese (Vancouver) Pageant, the annual Vancouver beauty pageant for Chinese Canadians